'Sarpdere can refer to:

 Sarpdere, Ezine
 Sarpdere, İpsala